Errada is a genus of planthoppers belonging to the family Achilidae.

The species of this genus are found in Japan.

Species:

Errada ambigua 
Errada backhoffi 
Errada funesta 
Errada ibukisana 
Errada jozankeana 
Errada nawae 
Errada nebulosa 
Errada niisimae 
Errada vittata

References

Achilidae